Revenue Scotland is a non-ministerial department of the Scottish Government responsible for the administration and collection of devolved taxes in Scotland. It is accountable to the Scottish Parliament.

History
Prior to 1707, Scotland was an independent state with its own system of taxation. This was abolished following the Union with England, and since then most taxes in Scotland had been collected by the UK Government.

Revenue Scotland was formed in 2012 as an administrative unit of the Scottish Government, in anticipation of it becoming responsible for collecting taxes devolved to the Scottish Parliament under the terms of the Scotland Act 2012. The Revenue Scotland and Tax Powers Act (RSTPA) 2014, which established the legal basis for the operation of Revenue Scotland, was passed by the Scottish Parliament in August 2014.

Revenue Scotland was founded on 1 January 2015, becoming the first Scotland-wide tax collection system in more than 300 years.

The Scotland Act 2016 devolved Air Passenger Duty and Aggregates Levy to the Parliament. However, devolution of Aggregates Levy has been delayed due to long running legal issues surrounding the tax. Additionally, there have been difficulties implementing the Scottish Government's designed replacement for Air Passenger Duty, Air Departure Tax, It is unknown when it will be introduced

Devolved taxes
 Land and Buildings Transaction Tax (LBTT)
 Scottish Landfill Tax (SLfT)

Governance structure
The Minister responsible for Revenue Scotland is the Cabinet Secretary for Finance, Kate Forbes MSP. Eleanor Emberson was appointed in 2012 to lead the organisation while it was being set up Elaine Lorimer succeeded Emberson as chief executive in March 2016.

The Board of Revenue Scotland is composed of six members. Its main role is to develop and approve Revenue Scotland’s overall strategy, approve final business plans and advise the Chief Executive on key appointments. It also performs an assurance role and advises on best practice.

Board 
Aidan O'Carrol is the current permanent chair.

 the members of the Board are:
 Aidan O'Carrol, Chair
 John Whiting CBE
 Lynn Bradley
 Jean Lindsay
 Martin McEwen
 Simon Cunningham

The Senior Management Team is composed of a Chief Executive, a Head of Legal Services, a Head of Tax and a Head of Corporate Functions.

See also
 HM Revenue and Customs
 Welsh Revenue Authority

References

External links
 

Non-ministerial departments of the Scottish Government
2012 establishments in Scotland
Revenue services
Taxation in Scotland
Government agencies established in 2012